As of 2019, Alaska has an estimated population of 731,545.

In 2005, the population of Alaska was 663,661, which is an increase of 5,906, or 0.9%, from the prior year and an increase of 36,730, or 5.9%, since the year 2000. This includes a natural increase since the last census of 36,590 people (53,132 births minus 16,542 deaths) and an increase due to net migration of 1,181 people into the state. Immigration from outside the United States resulted in a net increase of 5,800 people, and migration within the country produced a net loss of 4,619 people. More than half of the state's population lives in Anchorage, Juneau and Fairbanks, with two-fifths in Anchorage alone.  The Matanuska-Susistna Borough is one of the nation’s fastest growing areas, with an estimated population of 100,000 and projections of 130,000 by 2027.  The last census of the Matanuska-Susitna Borough in 2019 showed a population of 108,317. The Matanuska-Susitna Borough contains the incorporated townships of Wasilla and Palmer and is home to an indigenous population, The Dena'ina people have been in the area for 10,000 years.  Knik Tribal Council is a federally recognized tribe in the MAT-SU and a non-profit social service organization for Natives in the MAT-SU region.  This area contains the cities of Meadow Lakes, Big Lake, Houston, Talkeetna, Willow. There are 54 cities, townships and other populated areas in the Matanuska-Susistna Borough.

With a population of 710,231, according to the 2010 U.S. census, Alaska is the 48th most populous and least densely populated state.

For purposes of the federal census, the state is divided into artificial divisions defined geographically by the United States Census Bureau for statistical purposes only.

In 2006, Alaska had a larger percentage of tobacco smokers than the national average, with 24% of Alaskan adults smoking.

History
The 1870 Census in Alaska was conducted by U.S. Army personnel under the command of Major General Henry W. Halleck. This count showed 82,400 people. But because of duplication of tribes listed under different names, the inclusion of a tribe that did not exist, and exaggerated estimates, the number was not considered reliable.

Ancestry
According to the 2010 United States census, the racial composition of Alaska was the following:

 White: 66.7% (Non-Hispanic White: 64.1%)
 Black 3.6%
 Asian 5.4% (4.4% Filipino, 0.3% Chinese, 0.2% Laotian, 0.2% Japanese, 0.1% Indian, 0.1% Vietnamese, 0.1% Thai)
 American Indian or Alaskan Native 14.8%
 Pacific Islander: 1.0% (0.7% Samoan, 0.1% Hawaiian, 0.1% Tongan)
 Two or more races: 7.3%
Other races: 1.7%

The population was 5.5% of Hispanic or Latino origin (of any race) and 94.5% of Non-Hispanic and Latino origin (of any race).

The largest ancestry groups (which the Census defines as not including racial terms) in the state are:

 18.3% German 
 11.0% Irish 
 8.5% English 
 6.5% Norwegian 
 4.4% Filipino 
 3.8% French 
 3.7% Native American 
 3.3% Italian 
 3.0% Mexican 
 2.9% Scottish 
 2.7% Polish 
 2.5% Swedish 
 1.9% Dutch 
 1.4% Russian 

The vast and sparsely populated regions of northern and western Alaska are primarily inhabited by Alaska Natives, who are also numerous in the southeast. Anchorage, Fairbanks, and other parts of south-central and southeast Alaska have many White Americans of northern and western European ancestry. The Wrangell-Petersburg area has many residents of Scandinavian ancestry and the Aleutian Islands contain a large Filipino population. The vast majority of the state's Black population lives in Anchorage and Fairbanks. Also, Alaska has the largest percentage of American Indians of any state. Some of the Alaska Natives absorbed the small 1700s Russian-era settlement. There are some Creole people of natives and Russians mixture.

Birth data
Note: Births in table don't add up, because Hispanics are counted both by their ethnicity and by their race, giving a higher overall number.

Since 2016, data for births of White Hispanic origin are not collected, but included in one Hispanic group; persons of Hispanic origin may be of any race.

Languages
According to the 2005-2007 American Community Survey, 84.7% of people over the age of five speak only English at home. About 3.5% speak Spanish at home. About 2.2% speak an Indo-European language other than Spanish or English at home, about 4.3% speak an Asian language at home and about 5.3% speak other languages at home.

A total of 5.2% of Alaskans speak one of the state's 22 indigenous languages, known locally as "native languages".  These languages belong to two major language families: Eskimo–Aleut and Na-Dené.  As the homeland of these two major language families of North America, Alaska has been described as the crossroads of the continent, providing evidence for the recent settlement of North America via the Bering land bridge.

Eskimo–Aleut family
Aleut
Sirenik
Eskimo family
Central Alaskan Yup'ik
Central Siberian Yupik (Yuit)
Alutiiq (Pacific Gulf Yupik)
Naukan
Inuit family
Iñupiaq
Na-Dene family
Tlingit
Eyak
Athabaskan family (spec. Northern Athabaskan)
Ahtna
Dena’ina (Tanaina)
Deg Xinag (Deg Hit'an)
Gwich’in (Kutchin)
Hän
Holikachuk (Innoko)
Koyukon
Upper Kuskokwim (Kolchan)
Lower Tanana (Tanana)
Tanacross
Upper Tanana
Haida language
Tsimshianic
Coast Tsimshian

Religion

 Christian – 79.0%
 Protestant – 47.0%
 Evangelical Protestant – 26.0%
 Mainline Protestant – 19.0%
 Black Protestant – 2.0%
 Roman Catholic – 14.0%
 Orthodoxy – 12.5%
 Latter-day Saint – 4.0%
 Jehovah's Witnesses – <0.5%
 Other Christian – <0.5%

Other religions
 Jewish – 0.9% 
 Buddhist- <0.5%
 Islam – 0.5%
 Hindu – <0.5%
 Other world religions – <0.5%
 Other faiths – 2.0%
 Unaffiliated – 17.0%
 Refused to answer – 1.0%

Alaska's relatively large Orthodox Christian population is notable. The large Eastern Orthodox population (with 49 parishes and up to 50,000 followers) stems from early Russian colonization of the Americas (which centered on Alaska), and from missionary work among Alaska Natives. In 1795 the first Russian Orthodox church was built in Kodiak. Intermarriage with Alaskan Natives helped Russian immigrants integrate into Alaskan societies. As a result, a number of Russian Orthodox parishes gradually became established in Alaska.  many are affiliated with the Orthodox Church in America, while others are members of the Russian Orthodox Church Outside Russia.

The first Sitka Lutheran Church was built for Finnish people in New Archangel (present-day Sitka) in 1843.

Alaska has the largest Quaker population (by percentage) of any U.S. state.

, 3,060 Jews lived in Alaska. The number of Jehovah's Witnesses stands at a little less than 2,400. Estimates for the number of Alaskan Muslims range from 1,000 to 5,000.

See also 
 List of cities in Alaska

References

External links
 2000 Census of Population and Housing for Alaska, U.S. Census Bureau
Graphical Library of Demographic Change in Arctic Alaska

 
Economy of Alaska
Alaska